Hemistomia is a genus of minute freshwater snails with an operculum, aquatic gastropod molluscs or micromolluscs in the family Tateidae.

Species
Species within the genus Hemistomia include:
 
 Hemistomia andreae Haase & Zielske, 2015
 Hemistomia aquilonaris Haase & Bouchet, 1998
 Hemistomia beaumonti Ponder, 1982
 Hemistomia caledonica Crosse, 1872
 Hemistomia cautium Haase & Bouchet, 1998
 Hemistomia cockerelli Haase & Bouchet, 1998
 Hemistomia drubea Haase & Bouchet, 1998
 Hemistomia dystherata Haase & Bouchet, 1998
 Hemistomia eclima Haase & Bouchet, 1998
 Hemistomia fabrorum Haase & Bouchet, 1998
 Hemistomia flexicolumella Ponder, 1982
 Hemistomia fluminis Cockerell, 1930
 Hemistomia fridayi Haase & Bouchet, 1998
 Hemistomia gemma Ponder, 1982
 Hemistomia gorotitei Haase & Bouchet, 1998
 Hemistomia hansi Haase & Bouchet, 1998
 Hemistomia huliwa Haase & Bouchet, 1998
 Hemistomia lacinia Haase & Bouchet, 1998
 Hemistomia minor Haase & Bouchet, 1998
 Hemistomia minutissima Ponder, 1982
 Hemistomia napaia Haase & Bouchet, 1998
 Hemistomia neku Haase & Bouchet, 1998
 Hemistomia nyo Haase & Bouchet, 1998
 Hemistomia obeliscus Haase & Bouchet, 1998
 Hemistomia oxychila Haase & Bouchet, 1998
 Hemistomia pusillior (Iredale, 1944)
 Hemistomia pygmaea van Benthem Jutting, 1963
 Hemistomia rusticorum Haase & Bouchet, 1998
 Hemistomia saxifica Haase & Bouchet, 1998
 Hemistomia shostakovichi Haase & Bouchet, 1998
 Hemistomia ultima Haase & Bouchet, 1998
 Hemistomia whiteleggei (Brazier, 1889)
 Hemistomia winstonefi Haase & Bouchet, 1998
 Hemistomia xaracuu Haase & Bouchet, 1998
 Hemistomia yalayu Haase & Bouchet, 1998
 Hemistomia yuaga Haase & Bouchet, 1998

Species brought into synonymy
 Hemistomia crosseana(Gassies, 1874): synonym of Crosseana crosseana (Gassies, 1874)
 Hemistomia fallax Haase & Bouchet, 1998: synonym of Crosseana fallax (Haase & Bouchet, 1998) (original combination)
 Hemistomia melanosoma Haase & Bouchet, 1998: synonym of Crosseana melanosoma (Haase & Bouchet, 1998) (original combination)

References

 
Tateidae
Taxonomy articles created by Polbot